Lê Thành Dương (born 29 June 1988), better known by his stage name as Ngô Kiến Huy, is a Vietnamese singer, actor and television host. Huy began his career in 2008 after he won the contest Vươn tới ngôi sao (Rising to Star). He has released five studio albums and over 40 singles, and won several awards.  

For his film career, Huy starred roles in several critical acclaimed films such as Dandelion (2014), The Talent (2013), Sweet 20 (2015), The Girl from Yesterday and 49 Days 2 (2017). He also took role as a television host and hosted several shows such as The Masked Singer Vietnam and Crack Them Up.

References

External links

Fanpage in Facebook
Fanpage in Facebook
Official Youtube 

Living people
20th-century Vietnamese male singers
1988 births
People from Ho Chi Minh City
Vietnamese pop singers
21st-century Vietnamese male singers
Vietnamese male film actors